The Dow Jones Global Indexes (DJGI) is a family of international equity indexes, including world, region, and country indexes and economic sector, market sector, industry-group, and subgroup indexes created by Dow Jones Indexes a unit of Dow Jones & Company best known for the Dow Jones Industrial Average.

The indexes are constructed and weighted using capitalization weighting. They provide 95 percent market capitalization coverage of developed markets and emerging markets. More than 3000 DJGI indexes provide data on more than 5500 companies around the world. Market capitalization is float-adjusted.

Indices
Indexes for the United States, Canada, Japan, Hong Kong, Singapore, and Australia/New Zealand are constructed to cover 95 percent of market capitalization at the country level. A single European index covers an aggregate of all Western European nations, also representing 95 percent of the aggregate market. An Emerging Markets Index represents 10 countries in Latin America and Asia. Each of these three groups offers large-cap, mid-cap, and small-cap indexes. Dow Jones Style Indexes are built as subsets of the Dow Jones U.S. Total Market Index. The DJGI family includes indexes for 10 economic industries, 19 Supersectors, 41 sectors, and 114 subsectors. The indexes are reviewed quarterly.

Indices include:
Dow Jones Industrial Average
Dow Jones Composite Average
Dow Jones Global Titans 50
Dow Jones Transportation Average
Dow Jones Utility Average
Dow Jones Global ex-U.S. Index
Dow Jones Developed Markets Index
Dow Jones Emerging Markets Index
Dow Jones Americas Index
Dow Jones Latin America Index
Dow Jones Asia/Pacific Index
Dow Jones Middle East & Africa Index

External links
Dow Jones Titans Indices
Dow Jones Global Indices 

S&P Dow Jones Indices
Global stock market indices